The 2019–20 season is the 132nd competitive association football season in India.

National teams

India national football team

2019 King's Cup

India were invited to play King's Cup tournament by Thailand. This was India's first tournament under the new coach, Igor Štimac.

2019 Intercontinental Cup

This is the second edition of the Hero Intercontinental Cup, organised by AIFF. This year no national side from other confederation took part other than AFC. India participated along with Syria, Tajikistan and North Korea. India was able to draw their third match against Syria after being defeated by Tajikistan and North Korea in their first two matches.

2022 FIFA World Cup qualification
Group E

India national under-20 football team

Friendlies

Group A

9–12th place

11th place

2019 OFC Youth Development Tournament
Group B

Final

2019 SAFF U-18 Championship
Group B

Semi-final

Final

2020 AFC U-19 Championship qualification
Group F

India national under-17 football team

Friendlies

2020 AFC U-16 Championship qualification
Group B

AFC competitions

2020 AFC Champions League

Preliminary round 1

|+West Region

2020 AFC Cup

Preliminary round 2

|+South Asia Zone

Play-off round

|+South Asia Zone

Group E

Club competitions

Indian Super League

I-League

I-League 2nd Division

Preliminary round

Group A

Group B

Group C

Qualifiers

Indian Women's League

Group stage

Group A

Group B

Knock–out stage

Season Statistics

India national team

Goalscorers

Match Stats
<onlyinclude>{| class="wikitable sortable"
!Criteria
!Team 1
!Score
!Team 2
!Competition
|- 
|Highest Win
|
|1–0
|
|2019 King's Cup
|- 
|Highest Loss
|
|2–5
|
|2019 Intercontinental Cup
|- 
|}

India national under-20 team

Goalscorers

Match Stats
<onlyinclude>{| class="wikitable sortable"
!Criteria
!Team 1
!Score
!Team 2
!Competition
|- 
|Highest Win
|
|4–0
|
|2019 SAFF U-18 Championship
|- 
|Highest Loss
|
|0–4
|
|2020 AFC U-16 Championship qualification
|- 
|Highest Scoring
|
|4–1
|
|2019 OFC Youth Development Tournament
|}

India national under-17 team

Match Stats
<onlyinclude>{| class="wikitable sortable"
!Criteria
!Team 1
!Score
!Team 2
!Competition
|- 
|Highest Win
|
|7–0
|     Keçiörengücü
|2019 SAFF U-15 Championship  2019 SAFF U-15 Championship  Friendly
|- 
|Highest Loss
| –
| –
| –
| –
|- 
|Highest Scoring
|
|6–3
| Fenerbahçe SK
|Friendly
|}

India women's national team

Match Stats
<onlyinclude>{| class="wikitable sortable"
!Criteria
!Team 1
!Score
!Team 2
!Competition
|- 
|Highest Win
|
|0–6
|
|2019 South Asian Games
|- 
|Highest Loss
|
|1–5
|
|Friendly
|- 
|Highest Scoring
|  
|1–5  0–6
|  
|Friendly  2019 South Asian Games
|}

India women's national under-17 team

Match Stats
<onlyinclude>{| class="wikitable sortable"
!Criteria
!Team 1
!Score
!Team 2
!Competition
|- 
|Highest Win
|
|1–10
|
|2019 SAFF U-15 Women's Championship
|- 
|Highest Loss
|
|4–0
|
|Friendly
|- 
|Highest Scoring
|
|1–10
|
|2019 SAFF U-15 Women's Championship
|}

References

 
Football
Football
India
India
Seasons in Indian football